Azreh-ye Mokarrami (also Romanized as Azreh-ye Mokarramī) is a village in Sanjabi Rural District, Kuzaran District, Kermanshah County, Kermanshah Province, Iran. At the 2006 census, its population was 53, in 11 families.

References 

Populated places in Kermanshah County